Serine/threonine-protein kinase haspin is an enzyme that in humans is encoded by the GSG2 gene.

References

Further reading